Piezodorus lituratus, the gorse shield bug, is a species of Pentatomidae, a family of shield bugs.

Varieties
Piezodorus lituratus var. lituratus (Fabricius, 1794)
Piezodorus lituratus var. alliaceus (Germar, 1823)

Distribution
This species is present in Africa, in most of Europe, in Northern Asia (excluding China) and in North America.

Habitat
These shield bugs live in many habitats where host plants are present. They prefer dry and warm habitats, especially with sandy soil.

Description
These large shieldbugs occur in two adult colour forms. In the spring when they emerge and mate they are predominantly green, while the new generation that appears in the late summer has purplish-red markings on the pronotum and corium. In autumn they have a much paler color, prior to hibernation they may become darker, but after hibernation they are bright green.

In Piezodorus lituratus var. alliaceus the corium shows a uniform yellow-greenish color.

This species could be confused with the green shieldbug, Palomena prasina, but Piezodorus lituratus has a different habitat and red antennae.

Biology
Mating takes place from May to July, the females lay 10 to 20 eggs on the stems, leaves and fruits of the host plants. The nymphs occur until September. The adults of the new summer generation can be found from the end of July or beginning of August. Hibernation occurs in the imago stage.

The main host plants are various legumes (Fabaceae), especially common broom (Sarothamnus scoparius) and dyer's greenweed (Genista tinctoria), but also alfalfa (Medicago sativa), vetches (Vicia species), sweet-clover (Melilotus species), crown vetches (Coronilla species) sainfoins (Onobrychis species), lupin (Lupinus species) and others.

Life cycle

References

Bibliography
 Gärdenfors Ulf, red (2010). Rödlistade arter i Sverige 2010=The 2010 red list of Swedish species. Uppsala: Artdatabanken i samarbete med Naturvårdsverket. Libris 11818177. 
 Henry, Thomas J., and Richard C. Froeschner, eds. (1988), Catalog of the Heteroptera, or True Bugs, of Canada and the Continental United States
 Ekkehard Wachmann, Albert Melber, Jürgen Deckert: Wanzen. Band 4: Pentatomomorpha II: Pentatomoidea: Cydnidae, Thyreocoridae, Plataspidae, Acanthosomatidae, Scutelleridae, Pentatomidae. Goecke & Evers, Keltern 2008, .

External links
 Edkins Family Index
 Nature Spot
 Ipernity

Pentatomini
Hemiptera of Africa
Hemiptera of Asia
Hemiptera of Europe
Hemiptera of North America
Insects described in 1794
Taxa named by Johan Christian Fabricius